UFC 104: Machida vs. Shogun was a mixed martial arts event held by the Ultimate Fighting Championship (UFC) on October 24, 2009 in Los Angeles, California.

Background
As with UFC 103, the UFC announced a portion of the preliminary card would air live and commercial-free during an hour-long block on Spike.

Chase Gormley, who was slated to face Ben Rothwell, instead faced Stefan Struve after Rothwell's opponent was changed to Cain Velasquez. An injured Sean Sherk was replaced by Josh Neer against Gleison Tibau.

Additionally, on the day of the weigh-in, two fights were changed to catchweight status as Anthony Johnson, Josh Neer and Gleison Tibau all came in over the weight limit of their respective weight classes.

Results

Bonus awards
Fighters were awarded $60,000 bonuses.

Fight of the Night: Antoni Hardonk vs. Pat Barry
Knockout of the Night: Pat Barry
Submission of the Night: Stefan Struve

Reported payout
The following is the reported payout to the fighters as reported to the California State Athletic Commission. It does not include sponsor money or "locker room" bonuses often given by the UFC.

Lyoto Machida: ($200,000, includes $100,000 win bonus) def. Maurício Rua: (250,000) ^
Cain Velasquez: ($70,000 includes $35,000 win bonus) def. Ben Rothwell: ($50,000)
Gleison Tibau: ($38,000 includes $19,000 win bonus) def. Josh Neer: ($14,000)
Joe Stevenson: ($94,000 includes $47,000 win bonus) def. Spencer Fisher: ($26,000)
Anthony Johnson: ($30,000 includes $15,000 win bonus) def. Yoshiyuki Yoshida: ($12,000) ^
Ryan Bader: ($30,000 includes $15,000 win bonus) def. Eric Schafer: ($13,000)
Pat Barry: ($14,000 includes $7,000 win bonus) def. Antoni Hardonk: ($16,000)
Chael Sonnen: ($54,000 includes $27,000 win bonus) def. Yushin Okami: ($18,000)
Jorge Rivera: ($36,000 includes $18,000 win bonus) def. Rob Kimmons: ($9,000)
Kyle Kingsbury: ($16,000 includes $8,000 win bonus) def. Razak Al-Hassan: ($3,000)
Stefan Struve: ($14,000 includes $7,000 win bonus) def. Chase Gormley: ($10,000)

^ Anthony Johnson was reportedly fined 20 percent of his purse for failing to make the 170-pound welterweight limit. The CSAC's initial report did not include information on the penalty.

^ ''Due to the controversy surrounding the main event Rua received his full pay including his win bonus.

See also
 Ultimate Fighting Championship
 List of UFC champions
 List of UFC events
 2009 in UFC

References

External links

Ultimate Fighting Championship events
2009 in mixed martial arts
Mixed martial arts in Los Angeles
2009 in sports in California
Events in Los Angeles